Kathleen O'Rourke can refer to:
Kathy Kirby (born Kathleen O'Rourke, 1938–2011), English singer
Kathleen O'Rourke, writer of 2008 animated film Granny O'Grimm's Sleeping Beauty